Leo Kiacheli (born Leon Shengelaia; February 19, 1884 – December 19, 1963) was a Soviet and Georgian writer. He is noted for the novels Gvadi Bigva, Tavadis Kali Maya (Princess Maya), Almasgir Kibulan, and Haki Adzba.

Major works

Novels and novellas
 Tariel Golua (1916)
 Almazgir Kibulan (1925)
 Blood (1926—1927)
 Tavadis Kali Maya (Princess Maya) (1927)
 Haki Adzba (1933)
 Gvadi Bigva (1936—1937)
 Man of Mountain (1948)

References 

1884 births
1963 deaths
20th-century pseudonymous writers
20th-century writers from Georgia (country)
People from Kutais Governorate

People from Samegrelo-Zemo Svaneti
Stalin Prize winners
Recipients of the Order of Lenin
Recipients of the Order of the Red Banner of Labour
Socialist realism writers
Male writers from Georgia (country)
Soviet male writers
Burials at Mtatsminda Pantheon